Felipe K. Nunag (March 23, 1916 – March 17, 1957), also known as Boy Nunag, was a Filipino boxer who competed in the 1936 Summer Olympics at Berlin. He was eliminated in the second round of the flyweight class after losing his fight to Raoul Degryse.

He died in Cebu in the 1957 Cebu Douglas C-47 crash together with then president Ramon Magsaysay. He was aide de camp to president Ramon Magsaysay at the time of his death. He was a professor at the Philippine Military Academy.

References

External links
 
profile

1916 births
1957 deaths
Boxers from Cebu
Flyweight boxers
Olympic boxers of the Philippines
Boxers at the 1936 Summer Olympics
Victims of aviation accidents or incidents in the Philippines
Filipino male boxers
Victims of aviation accidents or incidents in 1957